Debout Sur Le Zinc is a French music band.

After their first 1999 self-titled album, their subsequent album L’homme à tue-tête released in May 2001 gained them media acclaim and public popularity. By the time their 2004 album Des singes et les moutons enhanced their repertoire, they were selling out venues such as La Cigale and touring internationally.  Songs from their latest album Les Promesses were featured in their first concert at the oldest music hall in Paris, the Olympia, where they played to a full house on May 16, 2006.

The band acknowledges influences from traditional French music and Irish music, rock, klezmer, and many styles that are considered dance hall music, such as gypsy jazz, tango, waltz.

Background
Debout Sur Le Zinc members have described themselves as an Irish folk group synthesized with a rock band.  Simon Mimoun and Olivier Sulpice met Christophe Bastien and Cédric “Momo” Ermolieff in high school.  Simon met Fred Trisson at university, and Fred introduced the band to his childhood friend Romain Sassigneux.  They began performing together in bars and on the street and with groups such as Garçons Bouchers and Les Ogres de Barback under the name Debout Sur Le Zinc as of 1996. William Lotvi joined as their bass player in 1998.

The idea for the name Debout Sur Le Zinc, literally “standing on the zinc,” originally came after a concert in which Christophe, guitarist/singer was standing on the bar counter playing the accordion. The discovery that the bar or zinc—the material bar countertops were once made of—used to serve as a stage for people to recite poems, sing or make political speeches, and the expression also being in a poem by Jacques Prévert further reinforced the name.

Group members

 Cédric (Momo) Ermolieff: drums, percussion, xylophone, backup vocals
 Simon Mimoun: vocals, violin, trumpet
 Romain Sassigneux: clarinet, vocals, guitar
 Olivier Sulpice: banjo, mandola, backup vocals
 Fred Trisson/Triska: accordion
 Thomas Benoît: double bass, bass
 Chadi Chouman: guitars

Previous group members 

 Christophe Bastien: guitar, vocals (until 2014)
 William Lovti: double bass, bass (until 2014)
 Marie Lalonde: guitar, vocals, ukulele (until 2015)

Discography 
 Debout Sur Le Zinc : First Album (October 1999)
La Pantomime
La Valse Misère
Dialogue De Sourds
Emilie
Au Comptoir
L'abbé Chamel
Le Grand Chemin
Yvonne
?
Ma Petite Chérie
L'ambition
La Jeunesse
 L'Homme à Tue-Tête : Second Album (May 2001)
Plein Comme Une Barrique
L'homme à Tue-tête
Les Manigances
Les Petites Envies De Meurtre
2 X Oui - Intro
2 X Oui
Le Roi Du Monde
Dans Le Métro
Désert
Slawek
Me Laissez Pas Seul
La Rengaine
Ton Petit Cirque
Un Jour De Moins
Où Est L'histoire
Les Sens Interdits
 Des Singes et Des Moutons : Third Album (May 2004)
Les Moutons
Le Bleu Du Miroir
Elle M'ennuie
Chut...
Elle
Les Mots D'amour
Comme Un Ange
Si L'idée Nous Enchante
Les Voisins
Les Angles
Marée Noire
Hop Là!
 Les Promesses : Fourth Album (April 2006)
 Des Larmes Sur Ma Manche
 Rester Debout
 Un Jour Ou L'autre
 Comme S'il En Pleuvait
 Te Promettre La Lune
 Les Tontons
 Fallait Pas
 La Déclaration
 La Lettre Perdue
 Mieux Que Rien
 De Fil En Aiguilles
 Un Défaut De Toi
 Anita
 La Pantomime 2

External links

 Band's website
 Information page (in French)
 Bureau Export

French musical groups
Gypsy punk